Fales is a surname. Notable people with the surname include:

Almira Fales (1809–1868), American nurse
David Fales (born 1990), American football player
DeCoursey Fales (1888–1966), American lawyer, banker, collector, bibliophile and yachtsman
Josef Fales, Czechoslovakian-born Soviet footballer
Martha Gandy Fales (1930–2006), American art historian and curator 
Steven Fales (born 1970), American playwright and actor

See also 

 Fales Library, special collections library at New York University